Juan Mónaco was the defending champion but withdrew before the event started.

João Sousa won the title, defeating Julien Benneteau 2–6, 7–5, 6–4 in the final. It was the first ATP World Tour singles title ever won by a Portuguese.

Seeds

Draw

Finals

Top half

Bottom half

Qualifying

Seeds

Qualifiers

Qualifying draw

First qualifier

Second qualifier

Third qualifier

Fourth qualifier

References
 Main Draw
 Qualifying Draw

Proton Malaysian Open - Singles
2013 Singles